IAG New Zealand (IAG NZ) is the New Zealand subsidiary of Insurance Australia Group. It is the largest general insurance company in New Zealand, just as its parent is the largest in Australia. It has a number of insurance brands it has acquired, including AMI Insurance, NZI and State Insurance. Its head office is in Auckland, New Zealand, and it has several offices throughout the country.


Brands
In New Zealand, IAG NZ offers products under the following brands: 
  AMI Insurance (formerly SIMU Insurance) - personal, business, farm and marine insurance
  DriveRight - provides breakdown insurance and extended vehicle warranties to motor dealers
  Mike Henry Travel Insurance - domestic and international travel insurance
  NAC Insurance - high-risk and short term vehicle insurance
  NZI (formerly New Zealand Insurance) - business, personal and rural insurance, exclusively though brokers
  State Insurance - home, contents, business, marine and vehicle insurance cover
  Swann Insurance (NZ) - classic car and motorbike insurance
  Lantern Insurance - brokerage exclusively selling NZI products
  Lumley Insurance - offered through intermediaries such as brokers and banks
 
Several New Zealand banks also resell IAG NZ insurance products.

References

External links
IAG New Zealand

Insurance companies of New Zealand
New Zealand subsidiaries of foreign companies